The Nelson was an automobile built in Detroit, Michigan by the E.A. Nelson Motor Car Company.  It was made from 1917 to 1921.

History 
The Nelson was designed by engineer Emil A. Nelson, who formerly worked for Oldsmobile, Packard, and Hupmobile. The Nelson,  designed along European lines, was equipped with a 2.4 liter four-cylinder aero-type engine with overhead cams.  The vehicle was built as a touring car, roadster and a handful of closed model sedans. Price for the touring car in 1919 was $1,500, .

Beginning production just before the U. S. joined in World War I and the post-war depression, caused E. A. Nelson's self-funded company to have financial issues.  Approximately 1,028 vehicles were built before bankruptcy in 1921.

References

Defunct motor vehicle manufacturers of the United States
Motor vehicle manufacturers based in Michigan
Defunct manufacturing companies based in Michigan
Vintage vehicles
1910s cars
1920s cars
Vehicle manufacturing companies established in 1917
Vehicle manufacturing companies disestablished in 1921
Cars introduced in 1917